Kankipadu was one of the Legislative Assembly constituencies of Andhra Pradesh state in India. It was in Krishna district.

History of the constituency
The Kankipadu constituency was first created for the Madras state Legislative Assembly in 1952. After the passing of the States Reorganisation Act, 1956, it became a part of the new Andhra Pradesh Legislative Assembly. After the passing of the Delimitation of Parliamentary and Assembly Constituencies Order, 1976, its extent was the Kankipadu, Poranki and Vijayawada firks in Vijayawada taluk excluding vijayawada municipality of Krishna district.

It was not present in the Delimitation of Parliamentary and Assembly Constituencies Order, 2008 and hence was defunct as of the 2009 Andhra Pradesh Legislative Assembly election.

Members of the Legislative assembly

Election results

See also
List of constituencies of the Andhra Pradesh Legislative Assembly
Krishna district

References

Krishna district
Former assembly constituencies of Andhra Pradesh